is a railway station of the Chūō Main Line, East Japan Railway Company (JR East) in the city of Ōtsuki, Yamanashi, Japan.

Lines
Torisawa Station is served by the Chūō Main Line / Chūō Rapid Line, and is 81.2 kilometers from the terminus of the line at Tokyo Station.

Station layout
The station consists of one ground level island platform, connected to the station building by a footbridge. The station is unattended.

Platforms

History

Torisawa Station opened on June 1, 1902, as a passenger and freight station on the Japanese National Railways (JNR) Chūō Main Line.  With the dissolution and privatization of the JNR on April 1, 1987, the station came under the control of the East Japan Railway Company.

Passenger statistics
In fiscal 2014, the station was used by an average of 871 passengers daily (boarding passengers only).
|}

Surrounding area
Torizawa-juku on the old Koshu-kaido

See also
 List of railway stations in Japan

References

 Miyoshi Kozo. Chuo-sen Machi to eki Hyaku-niju nen. JT Publishing (2009)

External links

Official home page.

Railway stations in Yamanashi Prefecture
Railway stations in Japan opened in 1902
Chūō Main Line
Stations of East Japan Railway Company
Ōtsuki, Yamanashi